The 2014–15 Washington State Cougars men's basketball team represented Washington State University during the 2014–15 NCAA Division I men's basketball season. This was Ernie Kent's first year as head coach at Washington State. The Cougars played their games at the Beasley Coliseum as members of the Pac-12 Conference. They finished the season 13–18, 7–11 in Pac-12 play to finish in a three way tie for eighth place. They lost in the first round of the Pac-12 tournament to California.

Previous season 
The 2014–15 Cougars finished the season with an overall record of 10–21, and 3–15 in the Pac-12 to finish in eleventh place. They lost in the first round of the Pac-12 tournament to Stanford. On March 18, 2014 it was announced that Ken Bone was fired after 5 seasons as head coach.

Off-season

Departures

Incoming Transfers

2014 Recruiting Class

Roster

Schedule

|-
!colspan=9 style="background:#981E32; color:#FFFFFF;"| Exhibition

|-
!colspan=9 style="background:#981E32; color:#FFFFFF;"| Non-conference regular season

|-
!colspan=9 style="background:#981E32;"| Pac-12 regular season

|-
!colspan=9 style="background:#981E32;"| Pac-12 Tournament

References

Washington State Cougars
Washington State Cougars men's basketball seasons
Washington State
Washington State